Peplidium foecundum  is a plant in the Phrymaceae family, native to South Australia, Queensland, the Northern Territory and New South Wales.

It was first described by William Robert Barker in 1992. The species epithet, foecundum, is a Latin adjective which describes the plant as "fruitful".

Description 
Peplidium foecundum is a prostrate terrestrial or aquatic plant with rooting branches. Its leaves are fleshy, and up  to 3 cm long on short (c. 0.5 mm) petioles. The leaves can float when found in water.  The flowers are small and solitary, growing on short shoots in the leaf axils, as racemes. There are two stamens. The fruit is an ovoid to globular capsule.

Habitat 
It is found in and beside ephemeral pools, in swamps, on and in the margins of claypans and swales.

References

External links 

 Peplidium foecundum occurrence data from the Australasian Virtual Herbarium

Flora of South Australia
Flora of New South Wales
Plants described in 1992
Flora of the Northern Territory
Flora of Queensland
Phrymaceae